O 9 was an  patrol submarines of the Royal Netherlands Navy. The ship was built by Koninklijke Maatschappij De Schelde shipyard in Flushing.

Service history
The submarine was ordered on 30 August 1921 and laid down in Flushing at the shipyard of Koninklijke Maatschappij De Schelde on 1 December 1923 or 23 September 1922. The launch took place on 7 April 1925. On 18 January 1926 the ship is commissioned in the Dutch navy.

In 1929 O 9, Jacob van Heemskerck, made a trip to the Baltic Sea for exercises. The next year on 30 July 1930 O 9, O 10, Jacob van Heemskerck and  visited Antwerp.

In 1931 O 9, O 10, Jacob van Heemskerck, Z 7 and Z 8, made again a trip to the Baltic Sea for exercises. In 1939 O 9 together with her sisters O 10, O 11 were attached to the coastal division. They acted as the offensive part of Dutch coastal defense.

From 9 to 11 May 1940 she and O 10 are on patrol off the coast of the Netherlands. During the patrol O 9 was attacked by German military airplanes. 12 May 1940 she, O 10 and a tugboat fled to the United Kingdom where they arrived on 15 May 1940.

During the war she patrolled the English Channel and the Bay of Biscay. From August 1940 to March 1944 O 9 was attached to the 7th Training Flotilla in Rothesay and used as an ASDIC piggy boat. 1 December 1944 O 9 was decommissioned and September 1945 stricken. October 1946 she was sold for scrapping.

References

External links
Description of ship

1925 ships
Ships built in Vlissingen
World War II submarines of the Netherlands
O 9-class submarines
Submarines built by Koninklijke Maatschappij De Schelde